Chrysocraspeda olearia is a moth of the family Geometridae first described by Achille Guenée in 1857. It is found in oriental regions such as India, Sri Lanka, and some Far-East Asian countries.

The host plant of the caterpillar is Syzygium cumini.

One subspecies is recognized.
Chrysocraspeda olearia ecteles Prout, 1938

References

Moths of Asia
Moths described in 1857